Events in the year 2022 in Albania.

Incumbents 

 President: Ilir Meta (until 28 July) Bajram Begaj (from 24 July)
 Prime Minister: Edi Rama
 Deputy Prime Minister: Arben Ahmetaj (until 28 July); Belinda Balluku (from 28 July)

Events 
Ongoing — COVID-19 pandemic in Albania (Until 1 April)

March 
 8 March – Albanian consulate in Kharkiv is destroyed during Russian shelling. No casualties are reported.

April 
 1 April - Albania transited to the endemic phase.

May 
 25 May - The 2022 UEFA Europa Conference League Final takes place at the Arena Kombëtare in Tirana. Roma defeats Feyenoord 1–0.

June 
 16 May - 4 June - The 2022 Albanian presidential election takes place. After three sessions in which the proposed candidates failed to obtain the necessary votes, the Parliament of Albania elects Chief of the General Staff Bajram Begaj as the new Albanian President.

July 
 19 July - Negotiations on the accession of North Macedonia and Albania to the European Union begin in Brussels.
 24 July - Former President Bujar Nishani died from COVID-19 Omicron complications.

November 
 12 November - Protests erupt in Tirana, Albania over rising costs of living, poverty, and the migrant surge to Britain from Albania.

Deaths 

 15 January - Ramazan Rragami, footballer (b. 1944)
 22 January - Robert Jashari, footballer (b. 1938)
 18 February - Bardhyl Londo, writer and poet (b. 1948)
 24 February - Luan Starova, writer (b. 1941)
 6 May - Hajdar Muneka, journalist (b. 1954)
 28 May - Bujar Nishani, politician (b. 1966)
 16 August - Pandi Siku, actor
 22 September - Sali Shijaku, painter (b. 1933)

References 

 
2020s in Albania
Years of the 21st century in Albania
Albania
Albania